The 1966 Cork Senior Hurling Championship was the 78th staging of the Cork Senior Hurling Championship since its establishment by the Cork County Board in 1887. The draw for the first round fixtures took place at the County Convention on 30 January 1966. The championship began on 3 April 1966 and ended on 9 October 1966.

St. Finbarr's were the defending champions, however, they were defeated by University College Cork at the semi-final stage.

On 9 October 1966, Avondhu won the championship following a 2-11 to 4-04 defeat of University College Cork in the final. This was their second championship title overall and their first in 14 championship seasons.

University College Cork's Seánie Barry was the championship's top scorer with 1-23.

Team changes

From Championship

Regraded to the Cork Intermediate Hurling Championship
 Castletownroche
 Cobh

Results

First round

Quarter-finals

Semi-finals

Final

Championship statistics

Top scorers

Top scorer overall

Top scorers in a single game

Miscellaneous

 Avondhu win the title for the first time since 1952

References

Cork Senior Hurling Championship
Cork Senior Hurling Championship